QY Puppis is a K-type supergiant star in the constellation of Puppis.

Properties 
QY Puppis has been classified in the General Catalogue of Variable Stars as a semiregular variable star of type SRD.

References 

Puppis
K-type supergiants
Semiregular variable stars
3026
063302
038031
Durchmusterung objects
Puppis, QY